Inga DeCarlo Fung Marchand (born September 6, 1978), better known by her stage name Foxy Brown, is an American rapper. After signing to Def Jam in 1996, she released her debut album, Ill Na Na, later that year on November 19, 1996. The album was certified platinum by the RIAA and has sold over 7 million copies worldwide. She was also part of the hip hop supergroup the Firm, along with Nas, AZ and Cormega (who was later replaced by Nature). The Firm's sole album arrived in 1997 and was released by Dr. Dre's Aftermath Entertainment. In 1999, her second album Chyna Doll, debuted at the top of the Billboard 200, making her the second female rapper to top the chart after Lauryn Hill in 1998.

Her third album Broken Silence, was released in 2001, which featured the Grammy-nominated track "Na Na Be Like". In 2003, she left Def Jam and canceled the release of her Ill Na Na 2 album, but returned in 2005 once Jay-Z, then the label's president and CEO, signed her again to begin work on another unreleased album titled Black Roses. Her mixtape Brooklyn Don Diva was released in May 2008, and her visual album, King Soon Come, was slated for 2019 release but has been delayed indefinitely.

Early life 
Marchand is a Trinidadian-American of Dougla (mixed Afro-Trinidadian and Indo-Trinidadian) and Chinese-Trinidadian descent. She and her two older brothers grew up in Park Slope, a middle-class neighborhood in Brooklyn. Her parents divorced when she was four, and her family  moved in with her maternal grandfather. She later attended  Brooklyn College Academy.

Career

1994–1996: Early career 
While still a teenager, Brown won a talent contest in the Park Slope neighborhood of Brooklyn, New York. Members of the production team Trackmasters who were working on LL Cool J's Mr. Smith album were in attendance that night and were impressed enough to invite Brown to rap on "I Shot Ya." She followed this debut with appearances on several RIAA platinum and gold singles from other artists, including remixes of songs "You're Makin' Me High" by Toni Braxton. Brown was also featured on the soundtrack to the 1996 film The Nutty Professor, on the songs "Touch Me, Tease Me" by Case and "Ain't No Nigga" by Jay-Z. She became an instant sensation due to being very talented and rapping provocatively at such a young age. The immediate success led to a label bidding war at the beginning of 1996, and in March, Def Jam Records won and added the then 17-year-old rapper to their roster.

1996–1997: Ill Na Na and The Firm 
In 1996, Brown released her debut album Ill Na Na to strong sales. The album sold over 128,000 copies in the first week, and debuted at No. 7 on the Billboard 200 album charts. The album was heavily produced by Trackmasters, and featured guest appearances from Jay-Z, Blackstreet, Method Man, and Kid Capri. The album was platinum and launched two hit singles: "Get Me Home" (featuring Blackstreet) and "I'll Be" (featuring Jay-Z).

Following the release of Ill Na Na, Brown joined fellow New York-based hip hop artists, Nas, AZ, and Cormega (later replaced by Nature) to form the supergroup known as The Firm. The album was released via Aftermath Records and was produced and recorded by the collective team of Dr. Dre, the Trackmasters, and Steve "Commissioner" Stoute, then of Violator Entertainment. An early form of The Firm appeared on "Affirmative Action" from Nas' second album It Was Written. A remix of the song and several group freestyles were on the album Nas, Foxy Brown, AZ, and Nature Present The Firm: The Album. The album entered the Billboard 200 album chart at No. 1.

In March 1997, she joined the spring break festivities hosted by MTV in Panama City, Florida, among other performers including rapper Snoop Dogg, pop group The Spice Girls, and rock band Stone Temple Pilots. Later, she joined the Smokin' Grooves tour hosted by the House of Blues with the headlining rap group Cypress Hill, along with other performers like Erykah Badu, The Roots, OutKast, and The Pharcyde, the tour set to begin in Boston, Massachusetts, in the summer of 1997. However, after missing several dates in the tour, she left it.

1998–1999: Chyna Doll 
Chyna Doll was released in January 1999 and debuted at No. 1 on the Billboard 200 Album chart, selling 173,000 copies in its opening week, making her the second female rapper to accomplish this feat after Lauryn Hill. However, its sales quickly declined in later weeks. Chyna Doll has been certified platinum after surpassing one million copies sold in shipments.

2000–2003: Broken Silence and Ill Na Na 2: The Fever 
In 2001, Brown released Broken Silence. The single  "BK Anthem" showcased Brown's "street" image and giving a tribute to her hometown, Brooklyn, and to famous rappers such as The Notorious B.I.G. and Jay-Z. The first single from the album was "Oh Yeah", which featured her then-boyfriend, Jamaican dancehall artist Spragga Benz. The track "Na Na Be Like" was produced by Kenya Fame Flames Miller and Nokio from Dru Hill. The song "Candy", which featured guest vocals from Kelis, was never officially released as a single, but was hugely successful on the radio; it managed to chart at 48 on the R&B/Hip-Hop Singles & Track Chart and number 10 on the Rap charts". Na Na Be Like" was also on the Blue Streak Soundtrack.

The album debuted on the Billboard Charts at No. 5, selling 130,000 units its first week. Like previous albums, Broken Silence also sold over 500,000 records and was certified gold by the RIAA.

In the same year, Brown recorded a song for the action-comedy film Rush Hour 2, Blow My Whistle, which is a collaboration with Japanese-American singer-songwriter Hikaru Utada, and was written by Utada herself alongside Pharrell Williams and Chad Hugo. The song is included on Def Jam's Rush Hour 2 Soundtrack, which peaked the 11th spot on both the Billboard 200 and the Top R&B/Hip-Hop Albums and also the first on the Top Soundtracks. "Blow My Whistle" was produced by The Neptunes.

In 2002, Brown returned to the music scene with her single "Stylin'", whose remix featured rappers Birdman, her brother Gavin, Loon, and N.O.R.E. It was to be the first single from her upcoming album Ill Na Na 2: The Fever. The next year, she was featured on DJ Kayslay's single "Too Much for Me" from his Street Sweeper's Volume One Mixtape. She also appeared on Luther Vandross' final studio album Dance with My Father. That April, Brown appeared on popular New York radio DJ Wendy Williams' radio show, and revealed the details of her relationships with Lyor Cohen, president of Def Jam Recordings at the time, and Sean "P. Diddy" Combs. Brown accused both of illegally trading her recording masters. She also announced that Cohen had cancelled promotion for her fourth album Ill Na Na 2: The Fever over personal disagreements. Therefore, "Stylin'" was released on the compilation album The Source Presents: Hip Hop Hits Vol. 6.

2004–2008: Black Roses and Brooklyn's Don Diva 
Upon leaving Def Jam Recordings after her disappointment in the cancelled promotion of her studio album, Ill Na Na 2: The Fever, Brown began recording in late 2004. Months later, she reunited with Jay-Z, performing dates on the Best of Both Worlds Tour. After signing back to Def Jam under his regime, Brown and Jay-Z began work on Black Roses with production by The Neptunes, Kanye West, Timbaland, Trackmasters, and Dave Kelly. Brown confirmed guest appearances by Barrington Levy, Dido, Luther Vandross, Mos Def, Baby Cham, Spragga Benz, Shyne, Big Daddy Kane, Rakim, KRS-One, Roxanne Shante, and Jay-Z, although it was uncertain whether all would make the final cut for the album.

In November 2004, Brown announced that the title for her upcoming album would be Black Roses, explaining, "My best friend Barrington Levy has a song called "Black Roses." He's been traveling all over the world and never seen a black rose in no other garden. When he found his black rose, he knew that shit was special. Y'all niggas can have all the female rappers in the world, but there's only one black rose. I feel that's me." Brown also announced that she would be the first artist signed to Jay-Z's upcoming imprint record label S. Carter Records. Rather than launching the imprint, though, Jay-Z became the new president and CEO of Def Jam Records, where he signed Brown as one of the first artists on his new roster. On December 8, 2005, Brown announced she had experienced severe and sudden hearing loss in both ears and she had not heard another person's voice in six months. Brown put Black Roses aside during this time. In June 2006, Brown said her hearing had been restored through surgery and she was planning to resume recording. Her label did not set a release date, but hoped the album would be out by the end of 2006. They were unsure if the title Black Roses would be kept. In November 2006, there was speculation that Jay-Z was disappointed in Foxy Brown's "lack of productivity on the album" and was planning to drop her from the Def Jam label. The planned December 2006 release of Black Roses was cancelled.

On May 22, 2007, Black Hand Entertainment announced a management deal with Brown, with Chaz Williams as her manager. No release date was set for Black Roses, but Brown said the album was nearly complete. Two days later, a release date of September 6 was announced. On August 16, Black Hand Entertainment announced that Brown would leave Def Jam to launch an independent record label, Black Rose Entertainment, distributed by Koch Records. A street album, Brooklyn's Don Diva, was eventually scheduled with a release date of December 4, but was delayed until the following year.

Brooklyn's Don Diva was ultimately released as a street album on May 13, 2008, after many delays triggered by her prison sentence. It contains two previously unreleased songs from her shelved album Ill Na Na 2: The Fever. The album peaked at No. 83 on the Billboard 200 chart, No. 8 on the Independent Albums chart, and No. 5 on the Top R&B/Hip-Hop Albums chart.

2009–2018: Other ventures 
In January 2011, Brown released the diss track "Massacre", a response to Lil' Kim's "Black Friday". On August 14, 2012, Foxy appeared as a special featured guest on Nicki Minaj's Pink Friday Tour in New York City. Rapper AZ later hinted in an interview that Brown was working on new material with Minaj. In August 2018, Brown made her first official guest appearance since 2009 on "Coco Chanel" from Nicki Minaj's fourth studio album Queen.

2019–present: Upcoming fourth studio album 
According to media sources, Brown is back to work on her upcoming fourth studio album. In 2019, Brown remixed Casanova's "So Brooklyn".

In August 2020, Brown reunited with her group The Firm for the song "Full Circle" from Nas' album King's Disease.

Artistry

Musical style 
Brown's lyrics have been described to be "raunchy" and "over-the-top" with "skimpy clothes to match." Her music is often centred around themes such as "fashion, sex, and the mafia" and is described as "intriguingly seductive" and having "a contemporary edge with a sleek and sexy soundscape." Her work for her debut album was described as "a heroine straight from the pages of a James Bond novel," selling over a million copies with the support of major male artists such as Nas and AZ. Brown's voice has been described as a "husky flow" with "dancehall swagger".

Although her work was compared to rapper Lil' Kim, Highsnobiety writer David Opie said that,
Just because they were both the 'First Ladies' of their respective crews, doesn't mean that Foxy or Kim were identical by any means, and it was hugely misogynistic to suggest otherwise [...] In an industry that still actively mocks vulnerability and weakness, hip hop needs more rappers who are willing to open up in this way, and the fact that Foxy did so such a long time ago speaks volumes about her artistry.

Influences 
Brown has cited Nas, MC Lyte and Salt-N-Pepa as her influences. It was these musical influences that helped Brown to make Broken Silence, "her most adventurous offering to date, dipping in and out of exotic sounds".

Legacy 
Brown's impact on the rap world has often been overlooked due to her legal run-ins, but it has been noted that "she's bright, talented, sexy and, most important, she's not afraid to take risks creatively" and that her "impact still stands." Her albums have been cited to harness "a winning formula of looping R&B songs into hip-hop hits, resulting in the genre-shifting record," Ill Na Na. The release of her album marked a monumental moment in hip-hop history, but was downplayed due to comparisons between her and rapper, Lil' Kim and although Foxy may not have achieved the "iconic status" Kim had reached, "her debut album was an essential part of a turning point in mainstream rap music." Rolling Stone author, Kathy Iandoli stated,

In seeing Foxy ... release [Ill Na Na] it was a reassurance that skills paid off; it didn't really matter who was helping with the rhymes. It was the delivery and the content that was being said, and whose mouth it was coming out of. It was just a reassurance to me as a hip-hop head that this space might be opening up for women in a way that has never been done before. There was something about what [she] said and how [she was] saying it, that was hinting that a huge change was about to come.

Cited as a fashion icon, Elle writer Janelle Harris wrote that Brown celebrated "the beauty of her mahogany skin as the self-professed 'dark-skinned Christian Dior poster girl,' boasted about being 'dripped in Gabbana [...] starring in billboards as big as the pride of the Black girls who saw themselves in her likeness."

Described as one of the "illest to ever do it – regardless of gender," Scott Glaysher of HipHopDX noted that "If those aforementioned male rappers epitomize the menacing New York City mobster of the late 90s then Foxy represents the mob wife that is even more sinister with weaponized sexuality." He stated that "the sheer confidence and astute rhyming Foxy brought to Ill Na Na, makes it one of the 90s most memorable albums and a catalyst for the fierce feminine rap wave that followed. In 2020, Spin ranked her at 20, as one of the 30 Best Female Rappers Ever.

Brown's sophomore studio album Chyna Doll debuted at number one in 1999, making it only the second female rap album to debut at the top spot after The Miseducation of Lauryn Hill in 1998 by Lauryn Hill and eventually joined by Let There Be Eve...Ruff Ryders' First Lady in 1999 by Eve, Pink Friday: Roman Reloaded in 2012 by Nicki Minaj and Invasion of Privacy in 2018 by Cardi B, . Her work has been paid homage to by numerous artists including, Nicki Minaj, Kash Doll, Bia, Ivorian Doll, Megan Thee Stallion and Maliibu Miitch. Minaj has even gone so far to say that without Foxy she "may have never even started rapping" and that she is "the most influential female rapper."

Personal life 
From 1997 to 1999, she was engaged to fellow rapper, Kurupt. In 2000, she announced that she was suffering from depression. She subsequently entered drug rehabilitation at Cornell University Medical College to receive treatment for opioid addiction, stating that she could no longer record or perform without resorting to morphine. Around 2001, she was engaged to Spragga Benz. Her uncle, Federico de la Asuncion, was one of 265 fatalities in the crash of American Airlines Flight 587 on November 12, 2001.

Brown suffered hearing loss from May 2005 to June 2006. She opted for a hearing aid, and, while recording music, had someone tap beats on her shoulder.

In 2013, Brown denied reports claiming that she had made disparaging remarks about Jay-Z. In an interview with Combat Jack, she stated: "He never said not one bad thing about me. So when that false story came out about me talking about him, it's like, why would I say those things about him?"

On January 13, 2017, she gave birth to her first child, a girl.

Comparisons between Brown and Lil Kim led to fierce competition. "Things got really personal when shots were fired outside a New York radio station." The two have not resolved the issue, with Foxy siding and collaborating with rapper Nicki Minaj in her feud with Kim in recent years. Following her release from prison, Kim does not acknowledge Brown. Brown, on the other hand, has consistently targeted Kim on a prime basis in her music and concerts since Kim's release.

Legal issues 

Brown has a substantial history of assault and menacing.
On September 7, 2007, New York City Criminal Court Judge Melissa Jackson sentenced Brown to one year in jail for violating her probation that stemmed from a fight in 2004 with two manicurists in a New York City nail salon. On September 12, representatives of the rapper disputed claims by her lawyer that she was pregnant. On October 23, 2007, Brown was given 76 days in solitary confinement due to a physical altercation that took place on October 3, with another prisoner. According to the prison authorities, Brown, the next day after the incident, was also verbally abusive toward correction officers and refused to take a random drug test. Prison authorities reported on November 27 that she was released "from solitary confinement...for good behavior", and Brown was finally released from prison on April 18, 2008.

On July 22, 2010, Brown was arrested and charged with one count of criminal contempt, which is a class E felony (the least severe), for violating an order of protection. The charge stems from an incident during the evening of July 21, 2010, in which it was claimed that Brown swore at and then mooned her neighbor Arlene Raymond, at whom she had thrown her BlackBerry, in 2007. Following the BlackBerry incident, Raymond sought and received a restraining order against Brown. Following her arrest, Brown appeared in court where she pleaded "not guilty" to the charge and was released on a $5,000 bail. If convicted, she faced up to seven years' imprisonment. On July 12, 2011, the charges were dropped.

Discography 

Studio albums
 Ill Na Na (1996)
 Chyna Doll (1999)
 Broken Silence (2001)

Collaboration albums
 The Album with The Firm (1997)

Tours

Headlined 

 Ill Na Na Tour (1997–1998)
 Chyna Doll Tour (1999)

Co-Headlined 

 Smokin' Grooves Tour (1997)
 No Way Out Tour (1997)
 Get Up On A Room (1999)
 Out4Fame Germany Tour (2015)

Appearences 

 Reasonable Doubt Tour (1996)
 Survival of the Illest (1998)
 The Black Album Tour (2003)
 Best of Both Worlds (2004)
 Pink Friday Tour (2012)

Filmography

Awards and nominations

Notes

References

Further reading

External links 

 Foxy Brown on ReverbNation

 
1978 births
Living people
American women rappers
East Coast hip hop musicians
Def Jam Recordings artists
MNRK Music Group artists
American people convicted of assault
American rappers of Trinidad and Tobago descent
American rappers of Asian descent
Fugitives wanted by Jamaica
People from Englewood Cliffs, New Jersey
 
People from Park Slope
Rappers from Brooklyn
20th-century American singers
20th-century American women singers
21st-century American women singers
21st-century American singers
Hardcore hip hop artists
21st-century American rappers
The Firm (hip hop group) members
Hip hop models
American female models
People of Dougla descent
Models from New York City
20th-century women rappers
21st-century women rappers
American people of Chinese descent
African-American women rappers